The office of Procurator of Saint Mark (Venetian: Procurador de San Marco) was one of the few lifetime appointments in the government of the Venetian Republic and was considered second only to that of the doge in prestige. It was routinely occupied by nobles belonging to the most influential families and typically represented the climax of a distinguished political career, although it was often an intermediate position prior to election as doge.

Origins
The office of procurator of Saint Mark originated in the ninth century with a single procurator , nominated to assist the doge in the administration of the Church of Saint Mark, the ducal chapel. Over time the number of procurators increased. A second was created in 1231 and a third in 1259. After 1261, there were four procurators, two of which, the procurators , retained responsibility for the financial administration of the Church of Saint Mark, its upkeep, and its decoration as well as its treasury. The other two procurators, called , administered trust funds established as pious donations on behalf of religious and charitable institutions. In 1319, there were six procurators, and in 1443 there were nine.

Beginning in 1516, initially to aid in the economic recovery from the War of the League of Cambrai, supernumerary procurators could also be created in moments of financial constraint in exchange for monetary contributions to the treasury. This amounted to the periodic sale of the prestigious title. The number of procurators fluctuated thereafter: in 1521, there were eighteen. At times, the number rose to forty. The effective sale of the position also made it possible for young and ambitious nobles to quickly rise to high office and to consequently exert great influence. In the sixteenth century, notably Antonio Cappello, Vettore Grimani, Federico Contarini, and Andrea Dolfin purchased the office.

Election

The first procurator was chosen by the doge. But after 1231, the procurators were elected by the Great Council.

Functions
In addition to the associated public honour, the office of procurator ensured an active role in the political life of Venice: after 1453, it guaranteed a seat in the Senate with the right to vote. Apart from extraordinary embassies to foreign courts, the procurators were also relieved from the obligation incumbent upon all nobles to accept political appointments, including on the Venetian mainland and in the overseas possessions, thus ensuring their presence in the city. The position also brought economic and financial influence through the management of vast amounts of capital and of investments in commercial and private real estate, in government bonds, and in securities and deposits. With the exception of the Doge's Palace, the procurators  were also specifically responsible for the construction, maintenance, and management of the public buildings around Saint Mark's Square, including the shops, food stalls, and apartments that were rented out as sources of revenue.

The Procurators' offices, called ridotti, were located on the upper floor of the Marciana Library in Saint Mark's Square.

The office today

The office of Procurator of St Mark's was not abolished at the fall of the Republic of Venice in 1797.  Instead, the Procurators remained responsible for administering the assets of St. Mark's Basilica, under the authority of the Patriarch of Venice.  

The position was confirmed by a royal decree issued by Victor Emmanuel III of Italy in 1931.  Today, there are seven procurators, with the president holding the title of First Procurator of St Mark's.  The Procurators work closely with architects and engineers to ensure the historic preservation of St. Mark's Basilica.

Notes

References

Bibliography 
 
 
 
 
 
 

Government of the Republic of Venice
St Mark's Basilica